The Saxophone Shop is an album by the American jazz saxophonist Odean Pope recorded in 1985 and released on the Italian Soul Note label.

Reception
The Allmusic review by Scott Yanow awarded the album 4½ stars stating "Odean Pope's "Saxophone Choir" is well-titled. The tenor saxophonist is joined by three altos and three tenors (along with a standard rhythm section) for six of his originals and two other songs that he arranged. The saxophonists primarily function as "background singers," making their voices heard mostly as accompanists for the leader. It's an interesting concept".

Track listing
All compositions by Odean Pope except as indicated
 "The Saxophone Shop" - 3:54 
 "Heavenly" (Eddie Green) - 2:52 
 "Cis" - 6:34 
 "Almost Like Me Part 2" - 2:34 
 "Prince la Sha" - 3:40 
 "Muntu Chant" - 4:32 
 "Doug's Prelude" (Clifford Jordan) - 4:14 
 "Elixir" - 6:26 
Recorded at Platinum Factory, Inc. in Brooklyn, New York on September 30 and October 1, 1985

Personnel
Odean Pope, Arthur Daniel, Bootsie Barnes, Bob Howell  – tenor saxophone
Julian Pressley, Sam Reed, Robert Landham - alto saxophone
Joe Sudler - baritone saxophone 
Eddie Green – piano
Gerald Veasley – bass
Dave Gibson – drums

References

Black Saint/Soul Note albums
Odean Pope albums
1985 albums